The Purton Hulks or Purton Ships' Graveyard is a number of abandoned boats and ships, deliberately beached beside the River Severn near Purton in Gloucestershire, England, to reinforce the river banks. Most were beached in the 1950s and are now in a state of considerable decay. The site forms the largest ship graveyard in mainland Britain.

A riverbank collapse in 1909 led to concerns that the barrier between the river and the Gloucester and Sharpness Canal would be breached.  Old vessels were run aground and soon filled with water and silt to create a tidal erosion barrier. The vessels included steel barges, Severn trows and concrete ships. The boats came from throughout the British Isles and were built in the second half of the 19th century and the first half of the 20th.

Since 2000, archaeological investigations have been undertaken to find out more about the vessels and their states of decay. Explanatory labels have been provided. One barge has been scheduled as an ancient monument and several are included in the National Register of Historic Vessels.

History 

The Gloucester and Sharpness Canal 

The  canal was dug between Gloucester and Sharpness; for much of its length it runs close to the  tidal River Severn, but cuts off a significant loop in the river, at a once-dangerous bend near Arlingham. It was once the broadest and deepest canal in the world. Conceived in the Canal Mania period of the late 18th century, the Gloucester and Berkeley Ship Canal scheme was authorised by a 1793 Act of Parliament. 

The canal opened in April 1827, having cost £440,000 in the course of its construction. The flood plain of the Severn hereabouts is very flat and so the elevation of the canal does not require any rise over its length. Outside the dock areas at each end, there are no locks. This encouraged the use of the canal for ships larger than on most other British canals, although there were a number of swing bridges to negotiate. In 1905 traffic exceeded one million tons for the first time. Oil was added to the list of cargoes carried by the canal, with bulk oil carriers taking fuel to storage tanks sited to the south of Gloucester.

Coastal defences 

The stretch of canal from Sharpness to Purton runs very close to the river. At a high spring tide they were separated by little more than the width of the towpath. The canal also has no locks, and owing to its width, not even any stop locks. Any damage to the canal bank could thus render the entire canal unnavigable.

In 1909, following a collapse in the bank of the river, the canal company's chief engineer Mr A. J. Cullis called for old vessels to be run aground along the bank of the Severn, near Purton, to create a makeshift tidal erosion barrier to reinforce the narrow strip of land between the river and canal. Barges, trows and schooners were "hulked" at high tide, by towing them from the dock at Sharpness and releasing them to be carried up the bank on the tide. Holes were then made in their hulls so that they filled with water, and over time silt has been laid down inside them.

More boats have been added, including the schooner Katherine Ellen which was impounded in 1921 for running guns to the Irish Republican Army (IRA), the Kennet Canal barge Harriett, and ferrocement barges built in World War II. The last boat was beached in 1965. The ground level has built up over the years and some of the more recent additions are lying on top of those which had been beached earlier.

Preservation 
In 1999, a local maritime historian, Paul Barnett, commenced a privately funded research project which saw the site's 86 vessels recorded and recognised as the largest ships' graveyard in mainland Britain. The Nautical Archaeology Society investigated the site in 2008 as part of its Diving into History Project, and carried out laser scanning of the remains. In 2010, British Waterways took control of the site in an attempt to protect it.

The only known surviving Kennet barge, Harriett, which was beached at Purton in 1964, has been scheduled as an ancient monument and included in the National Register of Historic Vessels, as are several ferro concrete barges. The remains of the vessels are not covered by the Protection of Wrecks Act 1973, as they are not on the seabed. But some of the other vessels may not be eligible for scheduling as ancient monuments, under the Ancient Monuments and Archaeological Areas Act 1979, because they are not inland. The issue and the responsibility of various statutory bodies in their protection was debated in the House of Commons in 2009.

Vessels 

The wooden vessels include examples of the Severn trow. Several concrete ships can also be seen at the site; these are built of steel and ferrocement (reinforced concrete).

Dispatch is notable for its use of, and the sole surviving remains of, Fell's Patent Knees. These were a patent innovation from 1839 by Jonathan Fell of Workington, Cumberland, and were part of the development of the iron and wood composite hull. Ships before this had been built from oak, where the strong curved brackets needed to join the deck into the hull side frames could be found as naturally grown 'knees' from the angles between major branches and the trunk. In the post-Nelsonic era there was a general shortage of shipbuilding timber, particularly oak, one of the few species with strong enough branch attachments to provide knees. 

Dispatch's hull is of pine, which has weak branches. A number of iron substitutes were developed, Fell's design being one of the later and more advanced forms. It had two advantages over earlier rigid-forged patterns: it provided a degree of flexibility in storms and, most significantly, could be stressed after the hull had been constructed and launched or even loaded, when the hull was under its working load. Together with the diagonal iron strapping, this rendered Dispatch's hull particularly strong and had allowed her to endure at least two collisions.

References

Bibliography

External links 

 

River Severn
Ship disposal
Ship graveyards
Stroud District